Jonathan Damian Hernandez (born July 18, 1985) is an American baseball coach, who is the current head baseball coach of the Bethune–Cookman Wildcats. He was the head coach for the ASA College Silver Storm (2014–2018).

Early life
Hernandez attended Hialeah High School, where he was a member of the baseball team. He helped guide the team to back-to-back state championships in 2001 and 2002.

Coaching career
Hernandez spent seasons as an assistant baseball coach at Miami Springs High School and Coral Gables Senior High School before landing his first ever head coaching job with the Hialeah High School. In 2014, Hernandez was named the first ever head coach at ASA College's Miami branch.
On August 14, 2018, Hernandez was named the head coach of the Bethune–Cookman Wildcats baseball program. Following a 17–38 season in 2019, Hernandez was able to land the 59th ranked recruiting class.

Head coaching record

See also
 List of current NCAA Division I baseball coaches

References

External links
ASA Silver Storm bio
Bethune–Cookman Wildcats bio

1985 births
Living people
High school baseball coaches in the United States
ASA College Silver Storm baseball coaches
Bethune–Cookman Wildcats baseball coaches
Hialeah Senior High School alumni